Noëlle van Lottum (born 12 July 1972, Hoogland) is a Dutch former professional tennis player who in the 1990s played for France.

Van Lottum was national youth champion both in the Netherlands and France. She played on the WTA Tour from 1987 until 1999, winning one singles and one doubles title. Her career-high singles ranking was World No. 57 (reached in January 1993) and her career-high doubles ranking was World No. 59 (reached in September 1992). With Virginie Buisson, she holds the record for the longest female match in the French Open; in the first round of the 1995 edition she lost to Buisson after 4 hours and 7 minutes.

Van Lottum currently  is the owner and director of a tennis school in the Netherlands.

She is the older sister of tennis player John van Lottum.

WTA Tour finals

Singles 1 (1–0)

Doubles 4 (1–3)

ITF Circuit finals

Singles (4-1)

Doubles (7-8)

External links
 
 

1972 births
Living people
Dutch female tennis players
Van Lottum, Noelle
Sportspeople from Amersfoort
20th-century Dutch women
21st-century Dutch women